Tamarack Grange is an unincorporated community in Penn Township, St. Joseph County, in the U.S. state of Indiana.

The community is part of the South Bend–Mishawaka IN-MI, Metropolitan Statistical Area.

History
A post office named Tamarack was established in 1837, but was soon discontinued, in 1838. The community was likely named after the tamarack larch.

Geography

References

Unincorporated communities in St. Joseph County, Indiana
Unincorporated communities in Indiana
South Bend – Mishawaka metropolitan area